2002 World Junior Championships may refer to:

 Athletics: 2002 World Junior Championships in Athletics
 Figure skating: 2002 World Junior Figure Skating Championships
 Ice hockey: 2002 World Junior Ice Hockey Championships
 Motorcycle speedway: 2002 Individual Speedway Junior World Championship

See also
 2002 World Cup
 2002 Continental Championships (disambiguation)
 2002 World Championships (disambiguation)